Northern Falcons Football Club is a semi-professional football club that is based in the northern Melbourne suburb of Thornbury. Founded in 1986 by the Sicilian Floridian community of Melbourne, the Falcons currently compete in Football Victoria State League 4 North

History

On field
The football club was established under the name of Flemington Floridia Soccer Club in October 1986 as the sporting arm of the Floridia Social Club. The club's inaugural home venue was the parkland at the foot of the Flemington commission housing on Flemington Road. The club debuted Victorian state league football in 1993, participating in the Provisional League Division Three, now formally recognized as Victoria's eighth tier. The club's senior squad achieved promotion twice in 2005 and in 2008 into the Victorian State League Division 4 where it competes today. The Falcons were runner's up in 2019 also but were not promoted to Victorian State League Division 3. Prior to the last match of the season against second placed Heidelberg Eagles, the Falcons only had to draw at a minimum to ensure its first premiership, and promotion, but were defeated 5–0.

Off field
The club is led by president Frank Pizzo who has earned recognition for the club from Football Victoria for numerous workings. In 2008, with support from the Darebin Council, Pizzo established the club's 'All Abilities' program for players with disabilities in weekly competitive competitions. In 2013, Football Victoria awarded Pizzo with the federations' annual volunteer of the year award for his & the club's efforts with the 'all abilities' program. Most recently the club embarked on starting a junior female program and in season 2021, they boast four all girls teams and a female community of over 80 people.

Name timeline

Staff
As of 23 July 20–21

Football department

Executive

Honours
Victorian Sixth Tier
Runner's up (2): 2008 (North-West), 2019 (North)
Victorian Seventh Tier
Runner's up (1): 2005 (North-West)

References

Soccer clubs in Melbourne
Association football clubs established in 1986
Italian-Australian culture in Melbourne
Italian-Australian backed sports clubs of Victoria
Victorian State League teams
1986 establishments in Australia
Sport in the City of Darebin